The Athens Governmental Buildings are a complex of buildings in central Athens, Ohio, United States.  Among these buildings are the Athens County Courthouse, the Athens City Hall, and the former post office, now Haning Hall of Ohio University.  The current post office is a much more recent building away from the town center, on East Stimson Avenue. Together, they were added to the National Register of Historic Places in 1979.

The oldest of the buildings included, the Silas Bingham House, also known as the old log courthouse, was built in 1804.  The Athens County Courthouse was built during 1877–80.  The Athens City Hall, built in the 1800s, was one of few city halls that old in southern Ohio which were still in use in 1999.  Haning Hall is a former post office.

Gallery

References

County courthouses in Ohio
City and town halls on the National Register of Historic Places in Ohio
Post office buildings in Ohio
National Register of Historic Places in Athens County, Ohio
City and town halls in Ohio
Clock towers in Ohio
Buildings and structures in Athens, Ohio